Olivier Beaudry (born 17 November 1977 in Epinay-sur-Seine, France) is a French karateka who won multiple medals at the European Karate Championships from 2001-2006.

 gold medalist at the 2006 European Karate Championships at men's kumite75kg
 gold medalist at the 2004 European Karate Championships at men's kumite75kg
 silver medalist at the 2003 European Karate Championships at men's kumite open
 bronze medalist at the 2001 European Karate Championships at the men's kumite75kg

References

External links
karaterec.com

French male karateka
1977 births
Sportspeople from Épinay-sur-Seine
Living people
Mediterranean Games gold medalists for France
Mediterranean Games medalists in karate
Competitors at the 2005 Mediterranean Games
21st-century French people
20th-century French people